Niger has a long history of petroleum exploration dating back to the 1970s. However, it is only recently in 2011 that the petroleum industry of Niger was born with the opening of the Agadem oilfield and the Soraz refinery near Zinder. The oil and gas extracted from the Agadem field are processed at the Soraz refinery and products (gasoline, diesel and liquified natural gas) are primarily for domestic consumption. Since the beginning of the oil extraction, it appears that the reserves have been underestimated: from an estimate of 324 million barrel reserves in 2008, it is believed that reserves are three times higher, near 1 billion barrels in 2013. With the increase in reserves, Niger anticipates an increase in its production from 20,000 to 80,000 barrels per day by 2016 with 60,000 barrels per day for exports via Chad and Cameroon.

Exploration 

The history of oil exploration and discovery in Niger goes back to the 1970s. The first tangible discovery occurred in 1975 at the Tintouma field near Madama. However, it was in the Agadem Basin, located in the north-east of the Niger, that exploration began in 1970 with first Texaco then Esso prospecting until 1980. In 1980, Elf Aquitaine held the permit on the Agadem block followed in 1985 by Esso and Elf, operating in a joint venture. Between 1990 and 1994, Esso and Elf dug five wells of which four resulted in discoveries. Esso dug three other wells between 1997 and 1998. Elf withdraw from the venture in 1998 and Esso was joined by Petronas in 2002.
After more than four years of exploration, Esso and Petronas abandoned the Agadem permit in 2006, judging it economically unprofitable. Unfortunately for the Esso and Petronas venture, the oil prices skyrocketed starting 2007 going from $30 to $147 in 2008. The reserves considered meager became more attractive and in 2008, China National Petroleum Corporation through its exploration and development company (CNODC) acquired the permit on the Agadem block. As part of the agreement with the government of Niger, CNODC created national branch in Niger (CNPC-NIGER-PETROLEUM SA) and carried out further exploration. Between 2008 and 2012, 76 exploration wells were completed of which 62 have resulted in discoveries. In 2013, a second exploration permit was awarded to CNODC with the reserves now estimated as high as 1 billion barrels. Since 2012, exploration has intensified with production-sharing contracts signed with international firms from Nigeria, Australia, UK and Bermuda.
In addition to the Agadem block, the Tenere block, licensed to CNPC, has potential reserves near 1 to 3 billion barrels of resources.

Petroleum production 
While the intended extraction aimed for 20,000 barrels per day, by mid-2012, only 10,000 barrels per day was achieved. As of the first trimester of 2013, 3 million barrels have been extracted from the Agadem block in its opening.

Petroleum refinery 
The beginning of oil production in Niger was followed with the construction of a refinery in Zinder commonly known as SORAZ. The total petroleum refining capacity is 20,000 barrels per day, which exceeds the 6,050 barrel per day domestic consumption as of 2010. The excess is intended for exports to neighboring countries such as Benin, Burkina Faso and Mali. The refinery can produce up 69,900 tonnes per year of liquified natural gas, 306,200 tonnes per year of gasoline and 505,400 tonnes per year of gas oil.

Petroleum exports 
At present (2014), the entirety of oil extracted is sent to the refinery in Zinder at present. However, a connection to the Chad-Cameroon pipeline is planned and has received approval from Chadian government and recently the Cameroonian Parliament. Niger intends to increase it oil production to 80,000 barrels per day of which 60,000 barrel per day will be exported via this pipeline by 2016.

References

External links

Economy of Niger
Niger